HiveColab is an innovation hub and startup incubator in Kampala, Uganda. The space was founded in 2010  and is noted as being one of Africa's first innovation hubs of note along with the IHub.   HiveColab was founded by African technologist and Appfrica CEO Jon Gosier, Senegalese Born, British Businesswoman Marieme Jamme, Daniel Stern, Teddy Ruge and supported by Director Barbara Birungi. The space is funded by Appfrica, IndigoTrust  and Dutch NGO Hivos. HiveColab is one of the founding members of Afrilabs a network of African innovation hubs across the continent. Barbara Birungi has stated she's passionate about how technology can change the future of Africa, for women in particular.

References

Technology companies of Uganda